Peter Pokorny may refer to:
Peter Pokorný (footballer) (born 2001), Slovak association footballer
Peter Pokorny (tennis) (born 1940), Austrian tennis player